Enteromius guirali is a species of cyprinid fish. It is endemic to Central Africa and occurs in Cameroon, Gabon, and the Republic of the Congo. It is a benthopelagic freshwater species that grows to  total length.

The fish is named in honor of explorer and naturalist Léon Guiral (1858-1885), who collected the type specimen in Zaire in 1885.

References

Enteromius
Freshwater fish of Cameroon
Fish of the Republic of the Congo
Fish of Gabon
Taxa named by Alexandre Thominot
Fish described in 1886